Andrew Geoffrey Woon (born 26 June 1952) is an English retired professional footballer who made 50 appearances in the Football League for Brentford as a forward. He later played non-League football for Maidstone United, Gravesend & Northfleet and Hastings United before injuries ended his career.

Career

Bognor Regis Town 
Woon began his career with hometown non-League club Bognor Regis Town and top-scored two seasons in a row to send the club to two successive promotions out of the Sussex League and into the Southern League First Division South. He departed Nyewood Lane in February 1973.

Brentford 
Woon joined with Third Division strugglers Brentford on trial in October 1972 and impressed enough to sign a professional contract for a £1,000 fee in February 1973. He had a whirlwind start to life at Griffin Park, when he became the only Brentford player to score a hat-trick on his debut in a 5–0 win over Port Vale on 10 February. He was the club's second-leading scorer during the 1973–74 season, before falling out of favour with incoming manager John Docherty in 1975 and departing the club at the end of the 1974–75 season.

Non-League football 
After his departure from Brentford, Woon played on in non-League football with Southern League clubs Maidstone United, Gravesend & Northfleet and Hastings United. Injuries ended his career at the latter club.

Personal life 
Woon worked for Jako.

Career statistics

Honours 
Bognor Regis Town
 Sussex League First Division: 1971–72
 Sussex League Second Division: 1970–71

References

1952 births
People from Bognor Regis
English footballers
Bognor Regis Town F.C. players
English Football League players
Southern Football League players
Association football forwards
Living people
Brentford F.C. players
Maidstone United F.C. (1897) players
Ebbsfleet United F.C. players
Hastings United F.C. (1948) players